The 2009 RCNJC season was the inaugural season for the Rugby Canada National Junior Championship.

Standings

Western Conference

Eastern Conference

Note: 4 points for a win, 2 points for a draw, 1 bonus point for a loss by 7 points or less, 1 bonus point for scoring 4 tries or more.

Playoffs

Championship final

The championship game was hosted in Vancouver, British Columbia and took place between the West Champion, Vancouver Wave and the East Champion, Toronto Rebellion. The Wave won the game by a score of 41 to 21.

References

Canada RCNJC Season
2009 in Canadian rugby union